Baranagar Road Railway Station is a Kolkata Suburban Railway station situated on Sealdah-Dankuni line in the city of Baranagar. It serves the local areas of Baranagar in North 24 Parganas district, West Bengal, India.

History
Sealdah–Dankuni line was opened in 1932 by the Eastern Bengal Railway. The line was electrified on 1965.

Station complex

The station complex is overall clean, porters/escalators, foods are available. There are excellent transport systems are availableBelghoria Expressway is beside the station and Barrackpore Trunk Road is under the station. There are also good lodging system and excellent railfanning systems are available in station complex. Sightseeing of this station is excellent.

Electrification
The Sealdah–Dankuni sector was electrified in 1964–65.

Connections

Metro
It is connected with Baranagar Metro Station of Kolkata Metro Line 1 and Kolkata Metro Line 5 .

Bus
This station is connected with B. T. Road and Belghoria Expressway, Gopal Lal Thakur Road.
 Various buses serve the station.

Auto
Several auto services are available on B. T. Road towards Sodepur, Dakshineswar, Sinthee, Baranagar Bazar.

See also
 List of railway stations in India

References

External links

 Baranagar-Dankuni trains
 Baranagar-Baruipara trains
 Baranagar-Sealdah trains

Baranagar
Railway stations in North 24 Parganas district
Sealdah railway division
Kolkata Suburban Railway stations
1865 establishments in British India
Railway stations opened in 1865